is a Japanese diplomat. He served as the Japanese ambassador to the United Kingdom from June 2016 until December 2020.

Biography 
Tsuruoka was born 10 August 1952. His father was a Japanese diplomat who served as Ambassador to the United Nations. He received a BA in Law from the University of Tokyo and an LLM from Harvard Law School. He joined the Japanese Ministry of Foreign Affairs in 1976.

He served as the first Director-General for Global Issues from 2006 to 2008. He then worked in the International Legal Affairs Bureau until 2010. He was Deputy Vice Minister for Foreign Policy from 2010 to 2012 and then Deputy Minister for Foreign Affairs from 2012 to 2013. In 2013, he was appointed chief negotiator to represent Japan in the Trans-Pacific Partnership negotiations.

References

External links

Ambassadors of Japan to the United Kingdom
Harvard University alumni
University of Tokyo alumni
People from Tokyo
1952 births
Living people